The steamship Altona operated from 1890 to 1907 on the Willamette River in the U.S. state of Oregon.  In 1907, she was transferred to Alaska.

Construction
Altona was built in 1890, at Portland, Oregon.  She was a sternwheeler driven by twin-single single cylinder horizontally mounted steam engines. She was built for the Graham steamboat line, formally called the Oregon City Transportation Company, but also known as the "Yellow Stack Line".  All the steamers of the line had names that ended in -ona: Latona, Ramona, Altona, Leona, Pomona, Oregona, and Grahamona.

Operations on Willamette River
Altona ran the Willamette River as far as Corvallis, Oregon.

Operations on the Yamhill River

In November 1901, Altona ran three times weekly from Portland to McMinnville, Oregon.  On January 6, 1902, the Oregon City Transportation Company, also known as the "Yellow Stack Line" advertised regular service, on the Altona from Portland to McMinnville.  Altona was scheduled to depart from Portland to McMinnville at 7:00 a.m. every Monday, Wednesday, and Friday, from the company's dock at the foot of Taylor Street in Portland.

On January 8, 1902, the water in the Yamhill River had risen too high to permit navigation through the recently completed Yamhill River lock and dam near Lafayette, Oregon.  The sternwheel steamer Altona which had just resumed the run from Portland to McMinnville after a hiatus of about three weeks, was forced to proceed no further than Dayton on the Yamhill River.

The previous suspension of service by Altona had been due to lack of business.  With no steamer service, the merchants of Dayton and McMinnville began considering building their own steamer.  Captain Graham, of the Oregon City Transportation Company, the owner of Altona, conferred with the merchants and explained his position.  The merchants agrees that they would provide sufficient business and Captain Graham agreed to keep Altona on the McMinnville run.

However, in 1902, despite the agreement of the merchants to patronize the steamers, the Oregon City Transportation Company withdrew their steamers permanently from service above Dayton.  This was said by the company to have been because the difficulties in predicting when the lock would be open during the winter months made it impossible to build up business.    Although efforts were made later to establish steamboat service to McMinnville, this withdrawal by the Oregon City Transportation Company marked the end of regular commercial steamboat use of the lock, even though it was to help establish that service that the lock had been built and completed just two years before.

Transfer to Alaska

In 1907, Altona was transferred to Cordova, Alaska.

Notes

References 
 Affleck, Edward L., A Century of Paddlewheelers in the Pacific Northwest, the Yukon, and Alaska, Alexander Nicholls Press, Vancouver, BC 2000 
 Dept. of Commerce and Labor, Annual Report of the Inspector-General of the Steamboat Inspection service, Government Printing Office, Washington, DC 1904
 Mills, Randall V., Sternwheelers up Columbia, Univ. of Nebraska (1947; 1977 printing) 
 Newell, Gordon R., ed., H.W. McCurdy Marine History of the Pacific Northwest, at 48, Superior Publishing, Seattle, WA 1966

Further reading 
 Corning, Howard McKinley, Willamette Landings, Oregon Historical Society (2d Ed. 1973)
 Timmen, Fritz Blow for the Landing: A Hundred Years of Steam Navigation on the Waters of the West, Caxton Printers, Caldwell, ID 1973

External links
Altona leaving Salem dock (Salem, Oregon Public Library image collection)

Steamboats of Oregon
Steamboats of Alaska
Columbia River
Steamboats of the Willamette River
Passenger ships of the United States
Ships built in Portland, Oregon
1890 ships
Oregon City Transportation Company